Carlisle Bogfield railway station, also known as Carlisle Water Lane railway station, served the city of Carlisle, in the historical county of Cumberland, England, from 1843 to 1844 on the Maryport and Carlisle Railway.

History 
The station was opened on 10 May 1843 by the Maryport and Carlisle Railway. It was a short-lived station, being replaced by  station on 30 December 1844.

References 

Disused railway stations in Cumbria
Former Maryport and Carlisle Railway stations
Railway stations in Great Britain opened in 1843
Railway stations in Great Britain closed in 1844
1843 establishments in England
1844 disestablishments in England